Uganda sent a delegation to compete at the 2008 Summer Paralympics in Beijing, China. According to official records, the only athlete was powerlifter Billy Ssengendo.

Powerlifting

Men

See also
Uganda at the Paralympics
Uganda at the 2008 Summer Olympics

References

External links
International Paralympic Committee

Nations at the 2008 Summer Paralympics
2008
Summer Paralympics